El Haouaria is a coastal town and commune in the Nabeul Governorate, Tunisia. As of 2004 it had a population of 9,273.

See also
List of cities in Tunisia

References

Populated places in Tunisia
Communes of Tunisia
Tunisia geography articles needing translation from French Wikipedia